Wimal is a Sri Lankan masculine given name. Notable people with the name include:

Wimal Kumara de Costa (1948–2016), Sri Lankan actor
Wimal Weerawansa (born 1965), Sri Lankan politician
Wimal Wickremasinghe (1942–2009), Sri Lankan politician and economist

Sinhalese masculine given names